Lac la Hache 220 is an Indian reserve of the Hatchet Lake Dene Nation in Saskatchewan. It is 354 kilometres north of Flin Flon. In the 2016 Canadian Census, it recorded a population of 1377 living in 260 of its 282 total private dwellings. In the same year, its Community Well-Being index was calculated at 37 of 100, compared to 58.4 for the average First Nations community and 77.5 for the average non-Indigenous community.

References

Indian reserves in Saskatchewan
Division No. 18, Saskatchewan